The  is a Japanese railway line entirely within Hashima, Gifu Prefecture. It is owned by Nagoya Railroad (Meitetsu), and operated as an extension of the Takehana line, providing a connection to the Tokaido Shinkansen at Gifu-Hashima Station.

History
Proposed in 1962, land acquisition difficulties prevented construction starting until 1978, and the line opened in 1982.

Stations

External links

References
This article incorporates material from the corresponding article in the Japanese Wikipedia

Rail transport in Gifu Prefecture
Hashima Line
Railway lines opened in 1982
1067 mm gauge railways in Japan
1982 establishments in Japan